is a former Japanese football player.

Playing career
Ota was born in Kyoto Prefecture on April 10, 1971. After graduating from Doshisha University, he joined Bellmare Hiratsuka in 1994. Although he played as forward in 2 matches in 1995, he could hardly play in the match. In 1996, he played for Japan Football League (JFL) club Cosmo Oil Yokkaichi and Regional Leagues club Blaze Kumamoto. In 1997, he moved to Regional Leagues club Albirex Niigata. He played as regular player and the club was promoted to JFL from 1998. He retired end of 1998 season.

Club statistics

References

External links

1971 births
Living people
Doshisha University alumni
Association football people from Kyoto Prefecture
Japanese footballers
J1 League players
Japan Football League (1992–1998) players
Shonan Bellmare players
Cosmo Oil Yokkaichi FC players
Albirex Niigata players
Association football forwards